The Seychelles Natural History Museum is a natural history museum in the Seychelles.

The museum is located in next to the main post office in Victoria, the capital of the Seychelles, on Mahé Island.

The displays include sections on botany, zoology, geology and anthropology. There are also some items related to the history of the Seychelles People's Militia, the Seychelles People's Liberation Army and the Seychelles People's Defence Forces.

Further reading

References

Museums with year of establishment missing
Museums in Seychelles
Natural history museums
Buildings and structures in Victoria, Seychelles